The 2015 Football Queensland season was the third season since NPL Queensland commenced as the top tier of Queensland men’s football. Below NPL Queensland is a regional structure of ten zones with their own leagues. The strongest of the zones is Football Brisbane with its senior men’s competition consisting of five divisions.

The NPL Queensland premiers qualified for the National Premier Leagues finals series, competing with the other state federation champions in a final knockout tournament to decide the National Premier Leagues Champion for 2015.

Men's League Tables

2015 National Premier League Queensland

The National Premier League Queensland 2015 season was contested by 12 teams, all playing each other twice for a total of 22 matches.

Finals

Top Scorers

2015 Brisbane Premier League

The 2015 Brisbane Premier League was the 33rd edition of the Brisbane Premier League which has been a second level domestic association football competition in Queensland since the Queensland State League was formed in 2008. 12 teams competed, all playing each other twice for a total of 22 matches. After 22 rounds, relegation was based on the Club Championship, and included points from First Grade, Reserve Grade, U18 and U16 teams.

Finals

2015 Capital League 1

The 2015 Capital League 1 season was the third edition of the Capital League 1 as the third level domestic football competition in Queensland. 12 teams competed, all playing each other twice for a total of 22 matches.

Finals

2015 Capital League 2

The 2015 Capital League 2 season was the third edition of the Capital League 2 as the fourth level domestic football competition in Queensland. 12 teams competed, all playing each other twice for a total of 22 matches.

Finals

2015 Capital League 3

The 2015 Capital League 3 season was the third edition of the Capital League 3 as the fifth level domestic football competition in Queensland. 12 teams competed, all playing each other twice for a total of 22 matches.

Finals

2015 Capital League 4

The 2015 Capital League 4 season was the third edition of the Capital League 4 as the sixth level domestic football competition in Queensland. 7 teams competed, all playing each other three times for a total of 18 matches.

Finals

Women's League Tables

2015 Women's NPL Queensland

The 2015 Women's NPL Queensland season was the first edition of the Women's NPL Queensland as the top level domestic football of women's competition in Queensland. 11 teams competed, all playing each other twice for a total of 20 matches, with the regular season concluding on 9 August, and the finals series concluding with the Grand Final on 12 September.

Finals

Cup Competitions

2015 Canale Travel Cup

Brisbane-based soccer clubs competed in 2015 for the Canale Cup. Clubs entered from the Brisbane Premier League, the Capital League 1, Capital League 2 and Capital League 3. 

This knockout competition was won by Queensland Lions. 

The competition was also part of the FQ Cup competition, where the final of the Canale Cup served as the semi-final for the FQ Cup.
The competition was also a qualifying competition for the 2015 FFA Cup. In addition to the Queensland Lions, Brisbane Strikers qualified for the final rounds, entering at the Round of 32.

FQ Cup

The competition also served as the Queensland Preliminary rounds for the 2015 FFA Cup. The four semi-finalists qualified for the final rounds of the FFA Cup; Far North Queensland FC (representing North Queensland), Palm Beach (representing South Queensland), with Brisbane Strikers and Queensland Lions representing Brisbane. The four semi-finalists, along with A-League club Brisbane Roar qualified for the final rounds, entering at the Round of 32.

References

Football Queensland
Football Queensland seasons